Heart Full of Soul is the debut solo studio album released by Blue band member and singer, Antony Costa. The album was released only in Japan.

Background
The album was recorded over the course of two years, and was executively produced and co-written by Simon Perry, alongside songwriter John McLaughlin, musician David Thomas, and co-production from the likes of Robbie Nevil and Dennis Johnson. The album was released on 3 July 2006, exclusively in Japan, following an argument with Costa's record label preventing a release in the United Kingdom. It failed to chart highly in Japan, and shortly after, Costa was dropped from the label. Only one single was released from the album, Do You Ever Think of Me, which peaked at #19 on the UK Singles Chart.

Production
The album was preceded by Costa's participation in Eurovision: Making Your Mind Up, where he attempted to represent the United Kingdom in the Eurovision Song Contest 2006, with the track "Beautiful Thing", co-written by McLaughlin, Michael Daley, Alison Pearce and Stanley Andrew. He came second, being beaten by eventual competition winner Daz Sampson, with his single "Teenage Life". The version of the album released in Japan uses a slightly different track listing to the original planned British release. The Japanese release contains the tracks "Predictable", "Never Too Late" and "I'll Keep Holding On", while the British release was due to include "Half a World Away", "Like I Do" and "Runaway Train", the former of which were released promotionally, but never released commercially. The tracks "Shine Your Light", "Runaway Train" and "Learn to Love Again" were also issued as B-sides to "Do You Ever Think of Me".

At the British Inspiration Awards on 24 May 2012, Costa stated that the inspiration to record the album came from his relationship with former fiancé Lucy Bolster, and their daughter, Emilie. He stated that the idea behind the concept of "Do You Ever Think of Me" stemmed from their break-up, and "Healing in Your Eyes" was written from a poem that Costa wrote about his daughter. While the album has never been released in the United Kingdom, "Do You Ever Think of Me" still received regular airplay on Chart Show TV and The Vault, in retrospective programmes surrounding Blue and each of their respective solo careers.

Track listing

Charts

References

2006 debut albums
Pop albums by English artists